Algeria has competed at every celebration of the Islamic Solidarity Games. Its athletes have won a total of 127 medals.

Medal tables

Medals by Islamic Solidarity Games

Below the table representing all Algerian medals around the games. Till now, Algeria win 85 medals and 15 gold medals.

Medals by sport

Athletes with most medals 

Notes: in Khaki the athletes still in activity.

Athletics
The Algerian athlete who won the most medals in the history of the Islamic Solidarity Games, by swimmer Oussama Sahnoune.

Notes: in Khaki the athletes still in activity.

See also
 Algeria at the Olympics
 Algeria at the African Games
 Algeria at the Pan Arab Games
 Algeria at the Mediterranean Games
 Algeria at the Paralympics
 Sports in Algeria

References